IQAir is a Swiss air quality technology company, specializing in protection against airborne pollutants, developing air quality monitoring and air cleaning products. IQAir also operates AirVisual, a real-time air quality information platform. As of February 2020, it had around 500 employees worldwide, 150 of them in China, and its most important markets were Asia and North America.

History 
IQAir was founded 1963 by brothers Manfred and Klaus Hammes, who introduced an air filter system for residential coal ovens in Germany to help reduce black dust build-up on the walls behind ovens. Manfred Hammes, a lifelong asthma sufferer, noticed that the filter reduced his flare-ups during the winter months.
Klaus Hammes continued through the 1960s and ’70s to adapt the air filter for other heating systems such as radiators, baseboard heating and forced-air heating and cooling systems. In 1982, Klaus Hammes relocated the company headquarters to Switzerland.

In the early 1990s, Frank Hammes, Klaus' oldest son, joined the company and expanded research and development as well as in-house manufacturing. In the spring of 1998, IQAir shipped its first high-performance air purifier from its Swiss factory. In 2001, Klaus Hammes' second son, Jens Hammes, joined the business and helped expand IQAir to Asia and the Middle East.

Products 
IQAir currently has products in four product categories, namely air purifiers, HVAC-based air cleaning, air quality instruments and the global air quality information platform AirVisual.

Technology 
IQAir employs a wide range of particulate and gas-phase removal technologies in its air purifiers and air filters. The company has been a vocal opponent of ionizing and ozone-producing air cleaning technologies. IQAir’s air quality information platform uses artificial intelligence (AI) to calibrate and validate thousands of governmental and non-governmental air quality monitoring stations.

Company organization 
IQAir is headquartered in Switzerland with major operations in Germany, the U.S., and China. Product development is based in Switzerland. As of 2020, manufacturing is based in Switzerland and Southern Germany.

As of 2015, IQAir was family-owned and did not publish concrete information about its revenue or profits.

Research studies 
Hospital Infection Control

A 2006 peer reviewed study reported that IQAir air purifiers reduced Methicillin-resistant Staphylococcus aureus (MRSA) contamination in hospital isolation rooms. The researchers concluded that "This portable HEPA-filtration unit can significantly reduce MRSA environmental contamination within patient isolation rooms, and this may prove to be a useful addition to existing MRSA infection control measures.”
 
A 2010 peer-reviewed study conducted at Singapore General Hospital found that the use of IQAir air purifiers reduced the spread of invasive aspergillosis (IA) by 50%. The researchers concluded that "The cost of widespread portable HEPA filtration in hospitals will be more than offset by the decreases in nosocomial infections in general and in IA in particular"

School Air Pollution Control

A 2013 peer-reviewed US government study conducted by researchers from the South Coast Air Quality Management District found that IQAir stand-alone air purifiers and HVAC-based air filtration was able to lower concentrations of ultrafine particles, fine particulate matter (PM2.5) and black carbon (BC) between 87% and 96%. 

In-Vehicle Air Pollution Control

A 2014 peer-reviewed passenger vehicle study funded by California Air Resources Board (CARB), conducted by researchers at the UCLA Fielding School of Public found that an IQAir cabin air filter was able to reduce ultra-fine particle exposure by 93% while keeping carbon dioxide concentrations in the range of 620-930 ppm. 

School Bus Air Pollution Control

A 2015 peer-reviewed study funded by CARB, conducted by researchers at the UCLA Fielding School of Public Health, found that an IQAir school bus air purifier was able to reduce harmful air pollutants by 88%. 

In-home Air Pollution Control

A CARB-funded study by Lawrence Berkeley National Laboratory into reducing in-home exposure to air pollution found that IQAir MERV16 filtration provided the greatest reductions in outdoor pollutant levels of the study with indoor/outdoor reductions of 97-98% for PM2.5, 97-99% for UFPs, and 84–92% for BC and 97% for ozone. 

A two-year study conducted by UC Davis and funded by CARB focused on households with asthmatic children found that the use of high-efficiency filtration improved indoor air quality in the homes. Installation of IQAir stand-alone air cleaners and high-efficiency filters in central air conditioning systems were shown to improve indoor air quality across all particle size fractions, with the greatest improvement in the smaller size fractions. The study also found that while participants did not report reduced asthma symptoms, they did have fewer doctors’ visits and slept better if they also kept their bedroom door closed.

Awards 
Air Purifiers:

Parent Tested Parent Approved (USA) "Award Winning Product" 2017
 The Gadgeteer (USA) "Best Gadget of the Year Award" 2017
International Housewares Association Global Innovation "Award for Product Design Personal Care" 2019
TWICE VIP (USA) "Award for Home Care Devices" 2019
Parent Tested Parent Approved (USA) "Seal of Approval" 2019
Tom's Guide (USA) "Best Air Purifiers" 2020

Air quality monitor:

AirParif "AirLab" Microsensor Challenge Laureate 2019 
BK Magazine awarded AirVisual "App of the Year" 2019

See also 
 Air purifier
 HEPA
 Indoor air quality

References 

Technology companies established in 1978
Technology companies of Switzerland
Environmental technology
Consumer electronics brands
Air pollution control systems
1963 establishments in Germany
German brands
Swiss brands